USRC Yamacraw, was a steel-hull flush-deck cutter that served in the United States Revenue Cutter Service from 1909 to 1937 and was the sister ship to the USRC Tahoma.

History
She was launched on 24 October 1908 by New York Shipbuilding at Camden, New Jersey. Her homeport was Savannah, Georgia where she enforced customs laws, conducted search and rescue operations and destroyed derelict vessels. After the start of World War I she also enforced neutrality laws along the eastern seaboard. During a search and rescue attempt on 4 March 1917 assisting the steamer Louisiana run aground near Ocean City, Maryland, the Yamacraw lost 10 of her crew. Several citations for heroism were awarded posthumously. After the United States declared war on Germany on 6 April 1917, Yamacraw was assigned to the U.S. Navy but retained her Coast Guard crew. She served as a patrol vessel in the Chesapeake Bay to Nantucket Shoals area until called for convoy duty to Europe. During convoy missions escorting merchant vessels she performed a rescue, saving four survivors of a torpedo attack. On escort duty Yamacraw cruised over 36,000 miles.  Upon return to Coast Guard control after the war, she returned to routine patrol work at Savannah. In the Spring of 1921 she served as part of the International Ice Patrol, returning to Savannah after July. After the passage of Prohibition, she took an active role in law enforcement along the southeastern coast. Yamacraw was decommissioned at Curtis Bay, Maryland on 11 December 1937 and sold for $10,300 on 13 April 1938 to Merritt-Chapman-Scott Corporation.

References

 United States Coast Guard Historian's Office: Yamacraw, 1909
 
 

Ships of the United States Revenue Cutter Service
Ships of the United States Coast Guard
Ships built by New York Shipbuilding Corporation
1909 ships
United States Navy ships crewed by the United States Coast Guard